Masaguro is a village in  the Ruvuma Region of southwestern Tanzania. It is located along the A19 road, to the southeast of  Namtumbo and northwest of Mchomolo.

References

External links
Maplandia

Populated places in Ruvuma Region